Sin Town is a 1942 American Western film directed by Ray Enright and starring Constance Bennett, Broderick Crawford and Patric Knowles. It is set during the Texas Oil Boom of the early 20th century.

Production   
According to the New York Times on July 31, 1942, Universal has signed Constance Bennett to play the feminine lead in Sin Town, a story of an oil-boom community, and the movie originally was planned for Marlene Dietrich. The cast included Broderick Crawford, Andy Devine and Leo Carrillo.

Main cast
 Constance Bennett as Kye Allen 
 Broderick Crawford as Dude McNair 
 Patric Knowles as Wade Crowell 
 Anne Gwynne as Laura Kirby  
 Leo Carrillo as Angelo Collina  
 Andy Devine as 'Judge' Eustace Vale 
 Ward Bond as Rock Delaney  
 Arthur Aylesworth as Sheriff Bagby 
 Ralf Harolde as 'Kentucky'Jones  
 Charles Wagenheim as 'Dry-Hole'  
 Billy Wayne as Hollister  
 Hobart Bosworth as Humiston  
 Bryant Washburn as Anderson 
 Jack Mulhall as Hanson

References

Bibliography
 Kellow, Brian. The Bennetts: An Acting Family. University Press of Kentucky, 2004.

External links

1942 films
1942 Western (genre) films
American Western (genre) films
American black-and-white films
1940s English-language films
Films directed by Ray Enright
Universal Pictures films
Films scored by Hans J. Salter
1940s American films